This is a list of French television related events from 2008.

Events
15 February - Quentin Mosimann wins the seventh series of Star Academy.
11 June - Amandine Bourgeois wins the sixth series of Nouvelle Star.
5 September - Matthias Pohl wins the second series of Secret Story.
13 November - 23-year-old fire artist Alexandre wins the third series of Incroyable Talent.
19 December - Mickels Réa wins the eighth series of Star Academy.

Debuts

Television shows

1940s
Le Jour du Seigneur (1949–present)

1950s
Présence protestante (1955-)

1970s
30 millions d'amis (1976-2016)

2000s
Nouvelle Star (2003-2010, 2012–present)
Plus belle la vie (2004–present)
Incroyable Talent (2006–present)
Secret Story (2007–present)

Ending this year
Sous le soleil (1996-2008)
Star Academy (2001-2008, 2012-2013)

Births

Deaths

See also
2008 in France